The ICL 20s World Series 2008/09 was the second international ICL tournament following on from the success of the previous one. The tournament commenced on 23 November 2008 but was cancelled halfway through due to the Mumbai terrorist attacks. The league consisted of four international teams: ICL India, ICL Pakistani, ICL World, and the new ICL Bangladesh. Each team playing each other once.

Fixtures

All of the fixtures in this edition of the ICL World Series were to be played at Sardar Vallabhbhai Patel Stadium, Ahmedabad.

Results

Standings

Final

Man of the Series:

References

Indian Cricket League seasons